{{Infobox film awards
| number            = 58
| award             = Bodil Awards
| date              = 27 February 2005
| site              = Imperial Cinema, Copenhagen
| host              = Michael Carøe
| best_film         = King's Game
| best_actor        = Mads Mikkelsen
| best_actor_film   = Pusher II
| best_actress      = Connie Nielsen
| best_actress_film = 'Brothers| most_wins         = King's Game (2)
| most_nominations  = King's Game and Brothers (5)
| last              = 57th
| next              = 59th
}}
The 58th Bodil Awards were held on 27 February 2005 in Imperial Cinema in Copenhagen, Denmark, honouring the best national and foreign films of 2004. Nikolaj Arcel's debut film King's Game and Susanne Bier's Brothers were both nominated for five awards. King's Game won the awards for Best Danish Film and Best Actor in a Supporting Role (Søren Pilmark) while Connie Nielsen won the award for Best Actress for her performance in Brothers. Mads Mikkelsen won the award for Best Actor for his performance in Pusher II.

 Winners 

 Best Danish Film 
 King's Game Brothers In Your Hands Pusher II Terkel in Trouble Best Actor in a Leading Role 
 Mads Mikkelsen – Pusher II Anders W. Berthelsen  King's Game Nikolaj Lie Kaas – Brothers Mikael Persbrandt – Dag og Nat Ulrich Thomsen – Brothers Best Actress in a Leading Role 
 Lotte Andersen – Oh Happy Day Sofie Gråbøl – Lad de små børn Ann Eleonora Jørgensen – Forbrydelser Connie Nielsen – Brothers Sonja Richter – Villa Paranoia Best Actor in a Supporting Role 
 Søren Pilmark – King's Game Nicolas Bro – King's Game Bent Mejding – Brothers Leif Sylvester – Pusher II Best Actress in a Supporting Role 
 Trine Dyrholm – Forbrydelser
 Nastja Arcel – King's Game Karen-Lise Mynster – Lad de små børn Sonja Richter – Forbrydelser Pia Vieth Familien Gregersen Best Danish Documentary 
 Tintin and I – Anders Østergård

 Best Cinematography 
 Morten Søborg – Pusher II and Brothers Best American Film 
 Lost in Translation Before Sunset Elephant Eternal Sunshine of the Spotless Mind Fahrenheit 9/11 Best Non-American Film 
 Look at Me Head-On (film) II'm Not Scared Take My Eyes The Return''

Bodil Special Award 
 Anders Refn

See also 

 2005 Robert Awards

References 

Bodil Awards ceremonies
2003 film awards
2004 in Copenhagen
February 2005 events in Europe